Samir Bouguerra (born July 18, 1982) is an amateur Algerian Greco-Roman wrestler, who played for the men's heavyweight category. He won a silver medal for his division at the 2007 All-Africa Games in Algiers, losing out to Egyptian wrestler and defending Olympic champion Karam Gaber.

Bouguerra represented Algeria at the 2008 Summer Olympics in Beijing, where he competed for the men's 96 kg class. He received a bye for the preliminary round of sixteen match, before losing out to China's Jiang Huachen, who was able to score eight points in two straight periods, leaving Bouguerra without a single point.

References

External links
NBC Olympics Profile
 

1982 births
Living people
Olympic wrestlers of Algeria
Wrestlers at the 2008 Summer Olympics
Algerian male sport wrestlers
African Games medalists in wrestling
African Games silver medalists for Algeria
Competitors at the 2007 All-Africa Games
21st-century Algerian people
20th-century Algerian people